
 
 

Clay Wells is a locality in the Australian state of South Australia located in the state's south-east within the Limestone Coast region about  south east of the state capital of Adelaide, and about  south-east and about  north-west respectively of the municipal seats of Robe and Millicent.

Boundaries for the locality were created for “the long established name” on 18 December 1997 for the portion within the Wattle Range Council while the portions in the District Council of Lucindale and District Council of Robe were respectively added in 1998 and 1999.

The land use within the locality is ‘primary production’.  A protected area known as the Reedy Creek Conservation Park is located in the watercourse of Reedy Creek which passes through the locality and forms part of its eastern boundary.

The 2016 Australian census which was conducted in August 2016 reports that Clay Wells had a population of 27 people.

Clay Wells is located within the federal division of Barker, the state electoral district of MacKillop and the local government areas of the District Council of Robe, the Wattle Range Council and the Naracoorte Lucindale Council.

References
Notes

Citations

 

Towns in South Australia
Limestone Coast